The whipsnout sorcerer (Venefica proboscidea) is an eel in the family Nettastomatidae (duckbill/witch eels). It was described by Léon Vaillant in 1888, originally under the genus Nettastoma. It is a marine, deep water-dwelling eel which is known from tropical, subtropical and temperate areas throughout the world.

References

Nettastomatidae
Fish described in 1888